Philomath is a city in Benton County, Oregon, United States. It was named for Philomath (Greek, "love of learning") College. The population was 4,584 at the 2010 census and was most recently estimated in 2019 to have a population of 5,666. It is part of the Corvallis, Oregon, Metropolitan Statistical Area.

History 
Philomath was named after the Philomath College  that was founded in 1867 by the United Brethren Church. The name of the college and city was derived from two Greek words meaning "lover of learning". The city was incorporated on October 20, 1882. The college closed in 1929 due to a dramatic decline in enrollment.

Geography

Climate
This region experiences warm (but not hot) and dry summers, with no average monthly temperatures above .  According to the Köppen Climate Classification system, Philomath has a warm-summer Mediterranean climate, abbreviated "Csb" on climate maps.

Demographics

2010 census
As of the census of 2010, there were 4,584 people, 1,733 households, and 1,203 families living in the city. The racial makeup of the city was 91.1% White, 0.7% African American, 1.2% Native American, 1.0% Asian, 2.4% from other races, and 3.7% from two or more races. Hispanic or Latino of any race were 6.7% of the population.

There were 1,733 households, of which 38.2% had children under the age of 18 living with them, 51.7% were married couples living together, 14.0% had a female householder with no husband present, 3.8% had a male householder with no wife present, and 30.6% were non-families. 23.4% of all households were made up of individuals, and 5.9% had someone living alone who was 65 years of age or older. The average household size was 2.64 and the average family size was 3.11.

The median age in the city was 34.3 years. 27.9% of residents were under the age of 18; 9.2% were between the ages of 18 and 24; 27.2% were from 25 to 44; 26.3% were from 45 to 64; and 9.4% were 65 years of age or older. The gender makeup of the city was 47.8% male and 52.2% female.

2000 census
As of the census of 2000, there were 3,838 people, 1,346 households, and 1,017 families living in the city. The population density was 2,993.0 people per square mile (1,157.7/km). There were 1,434 housing units at an average density of 1,118.3 per square mile (432.6/km). The racial makeup of the city was 93.25% White, 0.16% African American, 1.64% Native American, 1.20% Asian, 0.23% Pacific Islander, 1.25% from other races, and 2.27% from two or more races. Hispanic or Latino of any race were 3.93% of the population.

There were 1,346 households, out of which 47.3% had children under the age of 18 living with them, 55.8% were married couples living together, 15.1% had a female householder with no husband present, and 24.4% were non-families. 18.6% of all households were made up of individuals, and 5.1% had someone living alone who was 65 years of age or older. The average household size was 2.85 and the average family size was 3.22.

In the city, the population was spread out, with 34.3% under the age of 18, 7.1% from 18 to 24, 32.1% from 25 to 44, 19.6% from 45 to 64, and 6.9% who were 65 years of age or older. The median age was 32 years. For every 100 females, there were 98.9 males. For every 100 females age 18 and over, there were 95.2 males.

The median income for a household in the city was $41,461, and the median income for a family was $42,578. Males had a median income of $36,104 versus $25,281 for females. The per capita income for the city was $16,620. About 6.5% of families and 8.2% of the population were below the poverty line, including 9.2% of those under age 18 and 10.2% of those aged 65 or over.

Economy
Philomath is home to several sawmills including Georgia-Pacific and Paw Lumber Co. Gene Tools, LLC manufactures Morpholino antisense oligonucleotides. Wet Labs produces oceanographic measuring equipment. Pioneer Connect provides telephone, internet and video services, including fiber and broadband internet. Alyrica Networks provides WiFi access in the town, as well as fixed wireless high-speed Internet service. Solar Summit manufactures solar panels and alternative energy products. Gathering Together Farm is one of the first certified organic vegetable farms in the United States, and is an international agrotourism destination.

In 2020, Philomath residents were among the first in the world to receive their food deliveries from a robot; Daxbot, which is built by a Philomath-based business.  Daxbot is a 36in, semi-autonomous delivery robot who can keep food hot or cold, and makes free deliveries for businesses and individuals in Philomath.  The Philomath City Council gave Nova Dynamics permission to allow Dax to make deliveries and travel in town. Dax is considered a pedestrian, not a vehicle, and shares roads and sidewalks with other pedestrians, cyclists, and motorists.

Education
Philomath is served by the Philomath School District, which includes the following schools:
Philomath Elementary School
Clemens Primary School
Blodgett Elementary School
Philomath Middle School
Philomath Academy
Philomath High School
Kings Valley Charter School (Pre-K through 12th grade)

Parks and recreation 
The city of Philomath owns and maintains at least 8 public parks within and adjacent to the city limits. The largest park in Philomath is Marys River Park, which occupies approximately 28 acres along the Marys River and includes three bridges, a covered picnic shelter, and restrooms.

Mass media
The Philomath News is a digital newspaper owned by Brad Fuqua, former editor of the Philomath Express, which was shut down by Lee Enterprises in September 2020. The Philomath News launched on Nov. 30, 2020, and depends on voluntary memberships and digital advertising for revenue.

Documentary
The film Clear Cut: The Story of Philomath, Oregon documents the clash of cultures in Philomath between the old-time timber industry and the professionals and techies of the information age.  The film was shown in the Sundance Film Festival in 2006.

References

External links
Entry for Philomath in the Oregon Blue Book

Philomath Area Chamber of Commerce
Historic images of Philomath from Salem Public Library
Philomath Community Wiki

Cities in Oregon
Cities in Benton County, Oregon
Populated places established in 1882
1882 establishments in Oregon